Samborombón is a small rural community in Brandsen Partido in Buenos Aires Province, Argentina, located at Kilometer 90 of Route 2. The name Samborombón is a variation of San Borondón, the Spanish name of St. Brendan.

Population 
According to the last census the population count was 198.

Are there two Samborombón? 
About 10 km. southwest of Brandsen, near an old road that connected to Brandsen with Ranchos, is another place called Samborombón, which is often confused with the town. At that other Samborombón there is an abandoned train station of the former Rail Buenos Aires Province, a school, No. 16 of District Brandsen, and a few houses.

See also 
Samborombón River
Samborombón Bay

External links 

 Coord and NASA, Google images

Populated places in Buenos Aires Province